Don't Give Up (Swedish:Tappa inte sugen) is a 1947 Swedish musical comedy film directed by Lars-Eric Kjellgren and starring Nils Poppe, Annalisa Ericson and Gaby Stenberg. It was based on the 1941 British stage show Lady Behave by Edward Horan and Stanley Lupino.

The film's sets were designed by the art director Nils Svenwall.

Cast
 Nils Poppe as Pelle Olsson 
 Annalisa Ericson as Gulli  
 Gaby Stenberg as Sonja Lind  
 Ulla Sallert as Ylva Vendel  
 Karl-Arne Holmsten as Allan Berger  
 Sigge Fürst as Albert Svensson  
 Stig Järrel as Author Valle  
 Folke Hamrin as Studio Executive  
 Nils Jacobsson as Rudling 
 Arne Lindblad as André  
 Margit Andelius as CEO Secretary  
 Wiktor Andersson as Studio Auditor  
 Astrid Bodin as Cleaning Woman 
 Ernst Brunman as Jack  
 Eskil Eckert-Lundin as Man in the Studio  
 Lars Ekborg as Pelle Olsson's Neighbor 
 Carl-Axel Elfving as Assistant Director  
 Sven Ericsson as Pelle Olsson's Neighbor  
 Karl Erik Flens as Viktor  
 Albert Gaubier as Dancer  
 Stig Grybe as Pelle Olsson's Neighbor  
 Marie Hedeholm as Script Supervisor 
 Axel Isaksson as Man in the Studio  
 Tryggve Jerneman as Man in the Studio  
 Helge Karlsson as Doorman 
 Börje Lundh as Makeup Artist  
 Rune Magnusson as Sound Assistant  
 Mary Rapp as Model  
 Erik Rosén as Art Director 
 Alexander von Baumgarten as Bartender 
 Nils Whiten as Unit Manager

References

Bibliography 
 Monaco, James. The Encyclopedia of Film. Perigee Books, 1991.

External links 
 

1947 films
1947 musical comedy films
Swedish musical comedy films
1940s Swedish-language films
Films directed by Lars-Eric Kjellgren
Swedish black-and-white films
1940s Swedish films